Cecil Headlam (19 September 1872 – 12 August 1934) was an English first-class cricketer active 1895–1908 who played for Middlesex and Oxford University. He was born in Paddington; died in Charing.

Headlam was educated at Rugby School, then won a demyship at Magdalen College, Oxford. He travelled extensively and wrote travel books and histories, and edited anthologies including a collection of the poems of his brother Walter.

His recreations included cricket, fishing, golf, climbing, and gardening.

Works

References

Primary Sources
 Headlam, Walter & Cecil, Walter Headlam, His Letters and Poems, London: Duckworth, 1908

External links
 Cecil Headlam obituary

1872 births
1934 deaths
English cricketers
Middlesex cricketers
Oxford University cricketers
Marylebone Cricket Club cricketers
Gentlemen cricketers
Gentlemen of England cricketers
Oxfordshire cricketers
People educated at Rugby School
Alumni of Magdalen College, Oxford
English writers
C. I. Thornton's XI cricketers
Oxford University Authentics cricketers
People from Paddington
People from Charing